Blick may refer to:

 Blick, a daily Swiss newspaper
 Blick Art Materials
 Mount Blick, a mountain in East Antarctica

People

 Hugo Blick, English filmmaker
 Dick Blick (swimmer), American athlete 
 Joseph Blick (1867 - 1947), American architect
 Raymond Blick, a British sprint canoer
 Roy Early Blick, 20th century American law enforcement official

See also
 Blick's grass rat, a species of rodent
 Blic, a Serbian tabloid
 Blikk, a Hungarian tabloid